Barvala or Barwala (Ghelasa)  is a village of Barwala Taluka, Botad district, Gujarat, India. It is situated on the Utavli river.

References

Villages in Botad district